Tamela Jean Mann (née Johnson; born June 9, 1966) is an American gospel singer, songwriter, and actress. Mann began her career as a singer with the gospel group Kirk Franklin and the Family. She was a featured soloist on several tracks while with Franklin's group, including "Now Behold the Lamb", and "Lean on Me", the latter of which also included Mary J. Blige, Crystal Lewis, R. Kelly, and Bono. She began her solo career by releasing the albums Gotta Keep Movin (2005), and The Master Plan (2009).

Her third studio album, Best Days reached No. 1 on the Billboard Gospel albums chart, and was certified Gold by the RIAA. The lead single "Take Me to the King" 
was a commercial success, and earned her a nomination for the Grammy Award for Best Gospel/Contemporary Christian Music Performance. Her fourth studio album One Way (2016), also reached No. 1 on the Billboard Gospel Albums chart; and spawned the single "God Provides", which won her the Grammy Award for Best Gospel Performance/Song in 2017.

Mann also is known as actress. She has worked in multiple Tyler Perry productions playing the role of Cora Simmons. She appeared in films Diary of a Mad Black Woman (and recorded some songs on the soundtrack including participating in the song "Father (Can You Hear Me)", Meet the Browns (2008), Madea Goes to Jail (2009),  Madea's Big Happy Family (2011) and A Madea Homecoming (2022). On television, she starred in the TBS sitcom Meet the Browns from 2009 to 2011, and in 2020 began starring in the BET sitcom Tyler Perry's Assisted Living. She also starred and producer Bounce TV sitcom Mann & Wife (2015–17).

Along with her Grammy Award, Mann has earned many other accolades and honors, including multiple NAACP Image Awards, a Billboard Music Award, and a BET Award. In 2022, she was inducted into the Black Music & Entertainment Walk of Fame. She has received a total of nine No. 1 on Billboard’s Gospel Airplay chart singles; while "Take Me to the King" spent 25 weeks on the top.

Early life and career
Mann was born in Fort Worth, Texas, the youngest of 14 children. She and her siblings grew up in a very spiritual home grounded in the Church of God in Christ (COGIC). They were reared by their mother, "Mother Eppe," who believed in and exercised solid biblical principles.

By the age of 12, Mann was singing in the church's adult choir and was often selected to sing solos.  Although she was bashful, she blossomed in the local church and high school choirs.

Kirk Franklin and the Family
Mann's musical career began when she joined Kirk Franklin and the Family.  She has also enjoyed collaborating and performing with artists such as Yolanda Adams, Mary J. Blige, Al Green, Celine Dion, Bono, R. Kelly and Fred Hammond.  "Local legends" that have collaborated with Mann include" Demarcus Williams, Myron Williams, Kermit Wells, Excell Amos, Myron Butler and a host of others. She went on to join the gospel musical cast of David E. Talbert as he directed the stage play He Say... She Say... But What Does God Say?.

Solo musical career
In 2005, Mann and her husband David created their own label, Tillymann Music Group, through which they have released several projects. In 2005 her solo album, Gotta Keep Movin, was released. The lead single "Speak Lord" peaked at number 4 on the US Gospel chart. In 2007 she released her first live album, The Live Experience. Mann's songs "Father Can You Hear Me" and "Take It To Jesus" can be heard in the movie and on the soundtrack album of 2005 comedy-drama film Diary of a Mad Black Woman.

In 2009 her second studio album, The Master Plan, was released, adding a contemporary R&B sound. It peaked at number 2 on the Billboard Gospel Album Chart, and at number 97 on the Billboard 200.

Mann's third studio album, Best Days, was released on August 14, 2012. It debuted at number 1 on the Billboard Top Gospel Albums chart, and number 14 on the Billboard 200. The album was certified Gold by the RIAA and the lead single "Take Me to the King" was certified platinum and had major commercial success, as well as received a nomination for the Grammy Award for Best Gospel/Contemporary Christian Music Performance. In 2019, Billboard announced that Best Days was named the Gospel Album of the Decade.

Mann won the Stellar Award for "Best Female Gospel Artist of the Year" in 2014 and Best Gospel Artist at the 2014 BET Awards. In 2017, she won Grammy Award for Best Gospel Performance/Song for "God Provides".

In 2018, Mann released a duet album with her husband entitled, Us Against the World: The Love Project.

On August 7, 2020, Mann released the single "Touch from You" from her upcoming album. The single spent five weeks on the top and was her seventh number 1 on Billboard’s Gospel Airplay chart. Her sixth studio album called Overcomer was released in 2021; it received positive reviews from critics.

Clothing 
Aside from her musical and acting pursuits, Mann launched a new line of clothing, the Tamela Mann Collection, in 2019. The brand offers a variety of athleisure and workout wear for the curvy woman.

Acting career

Mann began acting in 1999 when she was discovered by Tyler Perry. She debuted in the stage play I Can Do Bad All By Myself in 2000. The following year, she appeared in the comedy film Kingdom Come. She went on to act in Perrys plays Meet the Browns, Madea's Family Reunion, Madea's Class Reunion, Diary of a Mad Black Woman and What's Done in the Dark. She has appeared on television shows including The Tonight Show with Jay Leno, BET Soundstage, the 1999 Grammy Awards, the Dove Awards, and the United States of America World Olympics.

In 2005, Mann appeared in the romantic comedy drama film Diary of a Mad Black Woman which was inspired by the play of the same name. She reprised her role in the 2008 film Meet The Browns, having more screen time. The following year, she began starring on TBS sitcom Meet the Browns, the series ran to 2011 and 140 episodes was produced. She also appeared in Madea Goes to Jail (2009),  Madea's Big Happy Family (2011).

In 2012, Mann appeared in the musical film Sparkle, a remake of the 1976 film of the same name, alongside Whitney Houston and American Idol winner and R&B singer Jordin Sparks, making her film debut. She co-starred opposite Lisa Arrindell Anderson in the 2014 drama film First Impression and starred and produced 2018 Christmas film Merry Wish-Mas with her husband. In 2021, she starred in the another holiday film, Soul Santa.

From 2015 to 2017, Mann starred in the Bounce TV comedy series, Mann & Wife. The series was canceled after three seasons. In 2020, she returned to her role as Cora Simmons in the BET sitcom Tyler Perry's Assisted Living. In 2022, she appeared in A Madea Homecoming on Netflix. She later was cast in The Color Purple, a film adaptation for the screen from the 2005 stage musical of the same name.

Personal life
Tamela is the wife of actor David Mann,  known for his role as Deacon Leroy Brown in some of Tyler Perry's plays. In the Madea TV shows and movies, she plays Mr. Brown's daughter, Cora.
The two have always worked together professionally.

David and Tamela renewed their 25th wedding vows in the spring of 2013. They raised five children together: David's daughters, Porcia, Tiffany and Tamela’s niece Sonya, and their  two children together, David Jr and Tia. They also have eight grandchildren.

In January 2015, a reality show about their family, It's A Mann's World, premiered on BET. David and Tamela are devout Christians, and in this program are able to show how they have a fun-loving, balanced family, centered in godly principles and coping with real-life obstacles. In 2019, Tamela joined the WW International family as a weightloss ambassador. On July 23, 2019, Tamela had double knee surgery just a couple of months after starting her weight loss journey. She recovered quickly and went on to lose 100 pounds of weight by January 1, 2020.

In 2019, Mann joined the Weight Watchers community as an Ambassador. She lost 
over 40 pounds by the end of 2019, and lost more weight in 2020 and 2021.

Filmography

Film

Television

Stage
 Madea's Farewell (2019) as Cora Simmons
 What's Done in the Dark (2007) as Cora Simmons
 Meet the Browns (2004) as Cora Simmons
 Madea's Class Reunion (2003) as Cora Simmons
 Madea's Family Reunion (2002) as Cora Simmons
 Diary of a Mad Black Woman (2001) as Myrtle Simmons
 I Can Do Bad All By Myself (2000) as Cora Simmons

Discography

Studio albums

Live albums

Soundtracks
Diary of a Mad Black Woman
Meet The Browns

Singles

As a lead artist
{| class="wikitable plainrowheaders" style="text-align:center;" border="1"
|+ List of singles, as a lead artist, with selected chart positions, showing year released and album name
! scope="col" rowspan="2" style="width:15em;"| Title
! scope="col" rowspan="2"| Year
! scope="col" colspan="4"| Peak chart positions
! scope="col" rowspan="2" style="width:10em;"| Certifications
! scope="col" rowspan="2"| Album
|-
! scope="col" style="width:3em;font-size:85%;"| USBub.
! scope="col" style="width:3em;font-size:85%;"| USGospel
! scope="col" style="width:3em;font-size:85%;"| USAdult R&B
! scope="col" style="width:3em;font-size:85%;"| US R&B/HH
|-
! scope="row"| "Speak Lord"
| rowspan="1" | 2006
| — || 4 || — || — 
|
| rowspan="1" | Gotta Keep Movin'''
|-
! scope="row"| "The Master Plan"
| rowspan="3" | 2010
| — || 13 || — || 100 
|
| rowspan="3" | The Master Plan|-
! scope="row"| "Joy Of The Lord"
| — || 14 || — || 96 
|
|-
! scope="row"| "Step Aside"
| — || 30 || — || — 
|
|-
! scope="row"| "Take Me to the King"
| rowspan="1"| 2012
| 4 || 1 || 9 || 44 
|
 RIAA: Platinum
| rowspan="1"| Best Days|-
! scope="row"| "I Can Only Imagine"
| rowspan="1"| 2014
| — || 2 || 29 || — 
|
| rowspan="2"| Best Days (Deluxe Version)|-
! scope="row"| "This Place"
| rowspan="1"| 2015
| — || 3 || — || — 
|
|-
! scope="row"| "God Provides"
| rowspan="1"| 2016
| — || 2 || — || —
|
| rowspan="4"| One Way|-
! scope="row"| "Change Me"
| rowspan="1"| 2017
| — || 1 || — || — 
|
|-
! scope="row"| "Through It All" (featuring Timbaland)
| 2018
| — || 5 || — || — 
|
|-
! scope="row"| "Potter"
| rowspan="3"| 2019
| — || 8 || — || — 
|
|-
! scope="row"| "Good Love"
| — || 14 || 18 || — 
|
| rowspan="2"| Us Against the World: The Love Project|-
! scope="row"| "Ups & Downs"
| — || 22 || 21 || — 
|
|-
! scope="row"| "Touch from You"
| rowspan="1"| 2020
| — || 4 || — || — 
|
| rowspan="4"| Overcomer|-
! scope="row"| "Help Me" (featuring The Fellas)
| rowspan="1"| 2021
| — || 9 || — || — 
|
|-
! scope="row"| "He Did It for Me"
| rowspan="2"| 2022
| — || 13 || — || — 
|
|-
! scope="row"| "Finished"
| — || 25 || — || — 
|-
|colspan="10" align="center" style="font-size:90%;"|"—" denotes items which were not released in that country or failed to chart.
|}

As a featured artist

Soundtrack and promotional singles

Other charted songs

Awards and nominations
Stellar Awards nominations:
2006: Gospel Album of the Year – Gotta Keep Movin2008: Female Vocalist of the Year  – The Live Experience2008: Contemporary Female Artist of The Year – The Live ExperienceDove Awards nominations:
Traditional Gospel Record Song of the Year – The Master PlanTraditional Gospel Album of the Year – The Master Plan: winner
2013 Traditional Gospel Album of the Year Best Days: winner
2013 NAACP Image Awards nominations:
Gospel Album of the Year – Best Days''
2017 Grammy Awards nominations:
2017 Best Gospel Song/Performance - God Provides: winner
2013 Grammy Awards nominations:
2013 Best Gospel/Contemporary Christian Music Performance – "Take Me to the King"
2014 Stellar Awards nominations:
Praise and Worship CD of the Year: winner
Urban/Inspirational Single or Performance of the Year: winner
CD of the Year: winner
Traditional Female Vocalist of the Year: winner
CD of the Year Award: winner
2014 BET Awards nominations:
Best Gospel Artist: winner
2022 American Music Awards nomination: F
Favorite Gospel Artist: winner

Notes

References

External links

1966 births
21st-century American singers
20th-century American singers
21st-century American actresses
Living people
African-American Christians
American gospel singers
Singers from Texas
People from Fort Worth, Texas
Actresses from Texas
African-American actresses
American film actresses
American stage actresses
20th-century American women singers
21st-century American women singers
20th-century African-American women singers
21st-century African-American women singers